Marlene DeChane (born July 8, 1956, Methuen, Massachusetts died Sept 20, 2020) was a Democratic member of the New Hampshire House of Representatives representing Strafford County District 6. First elected in 1994, she was re-elected in 1996, 1998, 2000, and 2006.

DeChane, who is openly gay, "sponsored the landmark Civil Rights Law of 1997 that banned discrimination based on sexual orientation."

Education
BS, Plymouth State University, 1978
AS, Mount Ida College, 1976

References

1956 births
Living people
People from Methuen, Massachusetts
Women state legislators in New Hampshire
LGBT state legislators in New Hampshire
Democratic Party members of the New Hampshire House of Representatives
Mount Ida College alumni
Plymouth State University alumni
People from Barrington, New Hampshire
LGBT people from Massachusetts
21st-century American women